El Purial, also known as Purial, is a rural hamlet in Aguada de Moya Popular Council, Camajuaní, Villa Clara, Cuba.

South of the town there are hills called Lomas El Purial or Hills El Purial in English. East of the town is Aguada de Moya, south of the town is La Piedra. West of the town is La Luz, CPA Benito Ramírez, and Guerrero.

Economy
According at the DMPF of Camajuani, El Purial is a settlement not linked to any source of an economic or job development but still are maintained.

Town Buildings 
In El Purial there are a few town buildings. There are 2 schools, they are Leoncio Vidal School, named after the Cuban Revolutionary Leoncio Vidal, and  Celestino Pacheco Primary. The hospital in the area is Consultorio Médico 17.

References 

Populated places in Villa Clara Province